The UN numbers range from UN0001 to about UN3600 and are assigned by the United Nations Committee of Experts on the Transport of Dangerous Goods.

UN 0001 to 0600 
 List of UN numbers 0001 to 0100
 List of UN numbers 0101 to 0200
 List of UN numbers 0201 to 0300
 List of UN numbers 0301 to 0400
 List of UN numbers 0401 to 0500
 List of UN numbers 0501 to 0600

UN 1000 to 2000 
 List of UN numbers 1001 to 1100
 List of UN numbers 1101 to 1200
 List of UN numbers 1201 to 1300
 List of UN numbers 1301 to 1400
 List of UN numbers 1401 to 1500
 List of UN numbers 1501 to 1600
 List of UN numbers 1601 to 1700
 List of UN numbers 1701 to 1800
 List of UN numbers 1801 to 1900
 List of UN numbers 1901 to 2000

UN 2001 to 3000 
 List of UN numbers 2001 to 2100
 List of UN numbers 2101 to 2200
 List of UN numbers 2201 to 2300
 List of UN numbers 2301 to 2400
 List of UN numbers 2401 to 2500
 List of UN numbers 2501 to 2600
 List of UN numbers 2601 to 2700
 List of UN numbers 2701 to 2800
 List of UN numbers 2801 to 2900
 List of UN numbers 2901 to 3000

UN 3001  and above 
 List of UN numbers 3001 to 3100
 List of UN numbers 3101 to 3200
 List of UN numbers 3201 to 3300
 List of UN numbers 3301 to 3400
 List of UN numbers 3401 to 3500
 List of UN numbers 3501 to 3600

References 
UN Dangerous Goods Transportation, cited on 26 April 2015
UN Dangerous Goods List
ADR Dangerous Goods List 2021
ADR Dangerous Goods substances